The smc Pentax DA 18-270mm F3.5-6.3 ED SDM is a superzoom lens manufactured by Pentax. It has been available since 2012.

References

18-270
Superzoom lenses
Camera lenses introduced in 2012